Derrick Osazemwinde (born 11 October 1993) is a British professional boxer. He became Ultimate Boxxer III middleweight champion in 2019.

Osaze was born and raised in Peckham, London, but is now based in Nottingham where he also preaches at the God's Vineyard Ministry where he was ordained as a minister in 2018.

Early life
Osaze was born and raised in Peckham, South East London, and is the fifth born of six children. Aged 15, having been excluded from school thirteen times and on the verge of being permanently expelled due to anger management issues, he turned to Boxing in 2009 after it was recommended to him by a friend who said it would be a great way to channel his energy positively. He quickly fell in love with the sport and repeatedly states "God led to me Boxing which ultimately saved my life, the sport has taught me so much, the biggest lesson being self-discipline, it's positively shaped my character and kept me out of trouble". He states, "Boxing went from a hobby, to a passion and now it's a lifestyle". Convinced by his parents to focus on finishing his GCSEs and A-Levels first. He would wait four years to have his first competitive bout aged 19 in 2013 for Phoenix ABC in Nottingham. He attended Nottingham Trent University, where he gained a BA (Hons) in Business Management and a Master's in Sport Psychology.

Amateur career

As an amateur Osaze won two national titles and one regional title in the process. He narrowly missed out on becoming a member of the England squad due to injury and was also in contention to represent Nigeria and attempt to qualify for the Rio 2016 Olympic Games after receiving a call up from the national head coach. He entered the professional ranks with 19 amateur fights.

Professional career
Osaze turned professional in 2017 under the tutelage of his coaches, former professional boxers; Barrington Brown, Mark Howell, and boxing manager Jimmy Gill who all believed that his fighting style was better suited to the pro ranks.
He would make his professional debut on 16 December 2017 when he fought Callum Ide at the Bingham Leisure Centre. Osaze won the fight via points decision.

Osaze won the Ultimate Boxxer III tournament on 10 May 2019 at The O2 in London. He defeated Tey Lynn Jones in his first bout, dropping Jones in the second round to secure a unanimous decision (UD) victory. He then followed that up by defeating pre-tournament favourite Kieron Conway via split decision (SD) in the semi-final. He then overcame Grant Dennis in the final, securing a majority decision (MD) helped by a third-round knockdown.

Professional boxing record

References

External links

Living people
1993 births
Boxers from Greater London
Middleweight boxers
British people of Nigerian descent
People from Peckham
Black British sportspeople